The League of Entropy (LoE) is a consortium of organizations working together to produce a distributed, publicly verifiable randomness beacon. Members currently include C4DT, ChainSafe, cLabs, Cloudflare, Emerald Onion, EPFL, Ethereum Foundation, IC3, Kudelski Security, Protocol Labs, PTisp, QRL Foundation, Tierion, UCL, and the University of Chile. The LoE began in 2019 with founding members Cloudflare, Protocol Labs researcher Nicolas Gailly, University of Chile, École Polytechnique Fédérale de Lausanne (EPFL), and Kudelski Security. It was created to provide an alternative to centralized randomness beacons where randomness generation can be compromised or manipulated, which happened in the Hot Lotto fraud scandal. Verifiable randomness has applications in election audits, lotteries, crypto-currencies, and privacy-preserving data management systems.

References

External links
League of Entropy at Cloudflare

Consortia